Blake is a surname which originated from Old English. Its derivation is uncertain; it could come from "blac", a nickname for someone who had dark hair or skin, or from "blaac", a nickname for someone with pale hair or skin. Another theory, presumably in the belief it is a Welsh patronymic in origin, for which there is no evidence, was that it is a corruption of "Ap Lake", meaning "Son of Lake".

Blake was the name of one of the 14 Tribes of Galway in Ireland. These Blakes were descendants of Richard Caddell, alias Blake, who was involved in the Norman invasion of Ireland in 1169. As such a long present foreign name, it became known as de Bláca in Irish.

The origins of the name Blake are also considered to be Old Norse, first appearing in Yorkshire, England, possibly derived from the word Blaker, referring to a village and a former municipality of Akershus county, Norway (east of Oslo).

Blake often refers to the British poet, painter and printmaker William Blake (1757–1827).

Notable people with the surname "Blake" include

A
Ackeem Blake (born 2002), Jamaican sprinter
Adam Blake (musician) (born 1976), English musician
Adrian Blake (born 2005), English footballer
Aisling Blake (born 1981), Irish squash player
Alan Blake (1922–2010), New Zealand rugby union footballer
Alan Blake (rugby league), Australian rugby league footballer
Alex Blake (disambiguation), multiple people
Alfonso Corona Blake (1919–1999), Mexican film director
Alfred Blake (1915–2013), British politician
Ally Blake, Australian writer
Amanda Blake (1929–1989), American actress
Andre Blake (born 1990), Jamaican footballer
Andrew Blake (disambiguation), multiple people
Anna Blake (disambiguation), multiple people
Annie Blake, Canadian politician
Anthony Blake (disambiguation), multiple people
Arron Blake (born 1987), English actor
Archie Blake (mathematician) (1906–??), American mathematician
Arthur Blake (disambiguation), multiple people
Asha Blake (born 1961), American journalist
Ashley Blake (born 1969), British television presenter
Ashley Herring Blake, American author
Avery Blake (1907–1975), American lacrosse player

B
Bandsman Jack Blake (1890–1960), British boxer
Barbara Hibbs Blake (1937–2019), American professor
Barry Blake (born 1937), Australian linguist
Benjamin Blake (1751–1827), English violinist
Bernard Blake (born 1992), American football player
Bert Blake (1908–1986), English footballer
Betty Blake (1931–1982), American preservationist
Betty Tackaberry Blake (1920–2015), American pilot
Billy Blake (1902–??), English footballer
Blind Blake (1896–1934), American musician
Bob Blake (disambiguation), multiple people
Bobby Blake (born 1957), American religious figure
Brayon Blake (born 1995), American basketball player
Brian Blake (disambiguation), multiple people
Brock Blake, American entrepreneur
Bruce Blake (judge) (1881–1957), American judge
Bruce P. Blake, American bishop
Bud Blake (1918–2005), American cartoonist

C
Callum Blake (born 1994), Ni-Vanuata cricketer
Caroline Blake (1835–1919), Irish landlord
Caroline Placide Waring Blake (1798–1881), American actress
Casey Blake (born 1973), American baseball player
Casey Nelson Blake, American historian
Catherine Blake (disambiguation), multiple people
Charles Blake (disambiguation), multiple people
Charlotte Blake (1885–1979), American composer
Chris Blake (born 1971), Welsh lawn bowler
Christian Blake (born 1996), American football player
Christopher Blake (1949–2004), English actor
Christopher Blake (archer) (born 1953), Australian archer
Cliff Blake, Australian agriculturalist
Curtis Blake (1917–2019), American businessman
Cyril Blake (1900–1951), Trinidadian trumpeter

D
Dan Blake (1882–1953), American football player
Darcy Blake (born 1988), Welsh footballer
David Blake (disambiguation), multiple people
Dave Blake (1925–2008), Canadian politician
Dennis Blake (born 1970), Jamaican sprinter
Derek Blake, British researcher
Dominick Blake (1806–1859), Irish clergyman
Dominique Blake (born 1987), Jamaican sprinter
Donald Blake (disambiguation), multiple people
Donovan Blake (born 1961), Jamaican-American cricketer
Doris Blake (disambiguation), multiple people
Dusty Blake (born 1982), American baseball coach

E
Ed Blake (1925–2009), American baseball player
Eddie Blake (disambiguation), multiple people
Edith Blake (1846–1926), Irish illustrator
Edmond Blake (1803–1895), American politician
Edward Blake (1833–1912), Canadian politician
Edward Reed Blake (1844–1932), American politician
Edwin Blake (1830–1914), New Zealand politician
E. E. Blake (1879–1961), English businessman
Eileen Blake (1878–1957), British artist
Elijah Blake (born 1982), Dominican-American singer
Eli Whitney Blake (1795–1886), American inventor
Eli Whitney Blake Jr. (1836–1895), American scientist
Emmet Reid Blake (1908–1997), American ornithologist
Eric Blake (born 1946), British boxer
Ernest Blake (disambiguation), multiple people
Ernie Blake (1913–1989), German entrepreneur
Esther McGowin Blake (1897–1979), American pilot
Eubie Blake (1887–1983), American pianist
Eugene Carson Blake (1906–1985), American religious figure
Euphemia Vale Blake (1817–1904), American author
Evon Blake (1906–1988), Jamaican journalist

F
Florence Blake (1907–1983), American nurse
Florence Turner Blake (1873–1959), Australian teacher
Francis Blake (disambiguation), multiple people
Frank Blake (born 1949), American businessman
Frank Blake (American football), American football coach
Frederic Columbus Blake, American engineer
Frederick Blake (disambiguation), multiple people

G
Geoffrey Blake (disambiguation), multiple people
George Blake (disambiguation), multiple people
Gerald Blake (disambiguation), multiple people
Gil Blake, American investor
Gillian Blake (born 1949), British actress
Gladys Blake (1910–1983), American character actress 
Gladys Blake (writer), American writer
Gordon Blake (1910–1997), American general
Grey Blake (1902–1971), British actor

H
Hamish Blake (born 1981), Australian comedian
Harold Henry Blake (1883–1960), British medical officer
Harris Blake (1929–2014), American politician
Harrison G. O. Blake (1818–1876), American politician
Harry Blake (disambiguation), multiple people
Helen Blake (born 1951), Jamaican sprinter
Henry Blake (disambiguation), multiple people
Herbert Blake (1894–1958), English footballer
Homer C. Blake (1822–1880), American naval officer
Howard Blake (born 1938), British composer

I
Inés Joyes y Blake (1731–1808), Spanish translator
Isidore Blake (1812–1882), Irish-Australian politician

J
Jack Blake (born 1994), English footballer
James Blake (disambiguation), multiple people
Jameson Blake (born 1997), Filipino-American actor
Jamie Blake (born 1975), American singer-songwriter
Janet Blake (??–1981), Canadian-American farmer
Jared Blake, American singer
Jason Blake (disambiguation), multiple people
Jay Don Blake (born 1958), American golfer
Jeff Blake (born 1970), American football player
Jennifer Blake (disambiguation), multiple people
Jere Blake (1875–1933), Welsh rugby union footballer
Jeremy Blake (1971–2007), American video artist and painter
Jerome Blake (born 1995), Canadian athlete
Jerry Blake (1908–1961), American saxophonist
Jim Blake (Australian politician) (1921–2010), Australian politician
Joaquín Blake (1759–1827), Spanish military officer
Joe Blake (1882–1931), English footballer
Joey Blake (born 1967), American tennis player
John Blake (disambiguation), multiple people
Johnathan Blake (born 1976), American drummer
Jon Blake (disambiguation), multiple people
Jonathan Blake (born 1987), American basketball player
Jonathan Blake (activist) (born 1949), British activist
Jorge Méndez Blake (born 1974), Mexican artist
Joseph Blake (disambiguation), multiple people
Josh Blake (born 1998), English cricketer
J. P. Blake (1874–1950), British politician
Judith Blake (disambiguation), multiple people
Julia Blake (born 1936), British-Australian actress
Juliet Blake, British-American film producer

K
Karen Blake, American disk jockey
Karl Blake (born 1956), English musician
Katharine Blake (actress) (1921–1991), South African actress
Katharine Blake (singer) (born 1970), British singer
Kathy Blake (born 1946), American tennis player
Kayla Blake (born 1963), American actress
Kendare Blake, American author
Korban Blake, British author

L
Larry Blake (disambiguation), multiple people
Lewis Blake (born 1946), British poet
Lillie Devereux Blake (1835–1913), American suffragist
Loretta Blake (1898–1981), American actress
Lorna Blake (born 1953), Puerto Rican swimmer
Lottie Isbell Blake (1876–1976), American physician
Lucius S. Blake (1816–1894), American businessman
Lucy Blake, American conservationist
Luke Blake, English rugby league footballer
Lyman Reed Blake (1835–1883), American inventor
Lynda Goodsell Blake (1906–1989), American missionary

M
Madge Blake (1899–1969), American actress
Marcus Blake, American musician
Margaret Day Blake (1876–1971), American art collector
Marion Elizabeth Blake (1892–1961), American professor
Mark Blake (disambiguation), multiple people
Marsha Stephanie Blake (born 1974), American actress
Martin Blake (disambiguation), multiple people
Marty Blake (1927–2013), American basketball executive
Matthew Blake (disambiguation), multiple people
Maurice Blake (disambiguation), multiple people
M. Brian Blake (born 1971), American computer engineer
Megan Blake (born 1959), American actress
Melanie Blake (born 1976), English talent agent and author
Melissa Blake, Canadian politician
Mervyn Blake (1907–2003), Canadian actor
Michael Blake (disambiguation), multiple people
Mick Blake (1874–1931), Australian rules footballer
Mickey Blake (1912–2000), Canadian ice hockey player
Millicent Kittredge Blake (1822–1907), American educational pioneer
Minden Blake (1913–1981), New Zealand pilot
Molly Blake (1917–2011), British illustrator
Morgan Blake (1889–1953), American sportswriter

N
Naomi Blake (1924–2018), British sculptor
Natalie Blake (born 1982), British powerlifter
Nathan Blake (born 1972), Welsh footballer
Nayland Blake (born 1960), American artist
Nicholas Blake (disambiguation), multiple people
Nickardo Blake (born 1989), Jamaican-American footballer
Nils Blake, Swedish nobleman
Noel Blake (born 1962), Jamaican footballer
Nola Blake, Australian criminal
Norman Blake (disambiguation), multiple people
Nyle Blake (born 1999), English footballer

O
Olivia Blake (born 1990), British politician

P
Pamela Blake (1915–2009), American actress
Patrick Blake (disambiguation), multiple people
Paul Blake (disambiguation), multiple people
Perry Blake (born 1970), Irish singer-songwriter
Peter Blake (disambiguation), multiple people
Phil Blake (born 1963), Australian rugby league footballer
Philip Blake (disambiguation), multiple people
P. L. Blake (born 1936), Canadian football player

Q
Quentin Blake (born 1932), English cartoonist

R
Rachael Blake (born 1971), Australian actress
Ran Blake (born 1935), American pianist
Randolph Blake (born 1945), American psychologist
Randy Blake (born 1986), American kickboxer
Rebecca Blake (born 1998), Romanian cricketer
Renée A. Blake, American professor
Richard Blake (disambiguation), multiple people
Ricky Blake (born 1967), American football player
Rob Blake (born 1969), Canadian ice hockey player
Robbie Blake (born 1976), English footballer
Robert Blake (disambiguation), multiple people
Robson Blake (born 1995), Welsh rugby union footballer
Rockwell Blake (born 1951), American operatic tenor
Rod Blake (born 1952), Australian rules footballer
Rodney Blake (born 1983), Australian rugby union footballer
Rodney Blake (basketball) (born 1966), American basketball player
Roger Blake (born 1957), Welsh actor
Ronald James Blake (born 1934), English civil engineer
Ronnie Blake (born 1972), American trumpeter
Roy Blake (disambiguation), multiple people
Russell Blake (footballer) (born 1935), English footballer
Russell Blake (author), American author
Ruth Blake, American geophysicist
Ryan Blake (disambiguation), multiple people

S
Samuel Blake (1807–1887), American politician
Samuel Hume Blake (1835–1914), Canadian politician
Sarah Blake (disambiguation), multiple people
Scott Blake (born 1976), American artist
Seamus Blake (born 1970), British-Canadian saxophonist
Sharon Magness Blake (born 1950), American horse breeder
Sheriff Blake (1899–1982), American baseball player
Sian Blake (1972–2016), British actress
Sidney Fay Blake (1892–1959), American botanist
Sophie Blake (born 1972), British television presenter
Stan Blake (born 1954), American politician
Stanley Thatcher Blake (1910–1973), Australian botanist
Stephanie Blake (born 1968), American actress
Stéphanie Blake (born 1968), American author
Stephen S. Blake, (1843–1929), Irish-American lawyer
Steve Blake (born 1980), American basketball player
S. Prestley Blake (1914–2021), American businessman
Susie Blake (born 1950), English actress
Susy Blake, American politician

T
Tamlin Blake (born 1974), South African artist
Tanya Blake (born 1971), British runner
Tchad Blake (born 1955), American record producer
Ted Blake (1921–1998), British inventor
Thomas Blake (disambiguation), multiple people
Tia Blake (1952–2015), American writer
Tim Blake (born 1952), English musician
Timothy Blake, American actress
Toe Blake (1912–1995), Canadian ice hockey player and coach
Tom Blake (disambiguation), multiple people
Tony Blake (disambiguation), multiple people
Torita Blake (born 1995), Australian athlete
Tra Blake, American referee
Trevor Blake (disambiguation), multiple people

V
Valentine Blake (disambiguation), multiple people
Valentino Blake (born 1990), American football player
Val Ffrench Blake (1913–2011), English horse breeder
Vivian Blake (1956–2010), Jamaican drug dealer
Vivian Blake (politician) (1921–2000), Jamaican lawyer and politician

W
Walter Blake (disambiguation), multiple people
Waqa Blake (born 1994), Fijian rugby league footballer
Wesley Blake (born 1987), American wrestler
Whitney Blake (1926–2002), American actress
Wilfred Theodore Blake (1894–1968), English aviator
Will Blake (born 1991), American painter
William Blake (disambiguation), multiple people
Winston Blake (1940–2016), Jamaican producer

Y
Yohan Blake (born 1989), Jamaican sprinter
Yvonne Blake (1940–2018), British costume designer

Z
Zoë Foster Blake (born 1980), Australian author

Fictional characters
Anita Blake, in the book series Anita Blake: Vampire Hunter
Daphne Blake, on the television series Scooby-Doo
Nico Blake, on the soap opera Hollyoaks
Bellamy and Octavia Blake, on the television series The 100
 Roj Blake of the eponymous television series Blake's Seven
Sexton Blake, in various British comic series
Sienna Blake, a character on the soap opera Hollyoaks

See also
Blake (disambiguation), a disambiguation page for "Blake"
Admiral Blake (disambiguation), a disambiguation page for Admirals surnamed "Blake"
Justice Blake (disambiguation), a disambiguation page for Justices surnamed "Blake"
Governor Blake (disambiguation), a disambiguation page for Governors surnamed "Blake"
General Blake (disambiguation), a disambiguation page for Generals surnamed "Blake"
Senator Blake (disambiguation), a disambiguation page for Senators surnamed "Blake"

References

English-language surnames
Surnames from nicknames